Doing Business may refer to:

 Doing business as (DBA), a legal term
 Doing Business Report, World Bank Group's yearly study of private sector development